Telomeric repeat-binding factor 2-interacting protein 1 also known as repressor activator protein 1 (Rap1) is a protein that in humans is encoded by the TERF2IP gene.

Interactions 
TERF2IP has been shown to interact with Ku80, Rad50 and TERF2. Upon interaction, TERF2IP/TERF2 complex has been shown to bind to telomeric junction sites with higher affinity

References

Further reading